The Stolica Mountains (Slovak: Stolické vrchy) is a mountain range in Slovakia, the highest part of the Slovak Ore Mountains of the Inner Western Carpathians.

The Stolica Mountains are divided into four distinct morphological sub-assemblies:

 Stolica
 Tŕstie
 Klenovské vrchy
 Málinské vrchy

The highest point of the Stolica Mountains is Stolica (1,476 metres above sea level).  The northern slopes of the Stolica is the source of the Sajó River.  The entire range is next to the Muránska planina National Park and the Slovak Paradise National Park.

Mountain ranges of Slovakia
Mountain ranges of the Western Carpathians